"Loving You Is Killing Me" is a song by American singer Aloe Blacc, with music and lyrics by Jeffrey Scott Silverman, Leon Marcus Michels, Clay Wells Holley, Nicholas Anthony Movshon and E. Nathaniel Dawkins and produced by Leon Michels and Jeff Dynamite.

Music video
The music video for the song was uploaded to YouTube on March 15, 2011. It features actor Miles Brown.

Credits and personnel
Lead vocals – Aloe Blacc
Producers – Leon Michels, Jeff Dynamite
Lyrics – Jeffrey Scott Silverman, Leon Marcus Michels, Nicholas Anthony Movshon, E. Nathaniel Dawkins
Label: Stones Throw Records

Live performances
Aloe Blacc performed the song on Later... with Jools Holland in 2010.

Track listings
Promo CD single #1
 "Loving You Is Killing Me" - 3:24

Promo CD single #2
 "Loving You Is Killing Me" (Bonnie & Clyde Radio Mix Edit) - 3:13
 "Loving You Is Killing Me" (Bonnie & Clyde Radio Mix Edit Instrumental) - 3:14

Digital download
 "Loving You Is Killing Me" (Numarek Single Mix) - 3:17
 "Loving You Is Killing Me" - 3:25
 "Loving You Is Killing Me" (Mano Le Tough Remix) - 7:29
 "Loving You Is Killing Me" (Music video) - 3:12

Chart performance

Year-end charts

Certifications

Release history

References 

2011 singles
Aloe Blacc songs
2010 songs
Songs written by Aloe Blacc